Milka is a brand of chocolate confectionery, originally made in Switzerland in 1901 by Suchard. It has then been produced in Lörrach, Germany from 1901. Since 2012 it has been owned by US-based company Mondelez International, when it started following the steps of its predecessor Kraft Foods Inc., which had taken over the brand in 1990. It is sold in bars and a number of novelty shapes for Easter and Christmas. Products with the Milka brand also include chocolate-covered cookies and biscuits. 

The brand's name is a portmanteau of the product's two main ingredients: "" (milk) and "" (cocoa).

History

On November 17, 1825, Swiss chocolatier Philippe Suchard (1797–1884) established a pâtisserie in Neuchâtel where he sold a hand-made dessert, chocolat fin de sa fabrique. The following year, Suchard founded Chocolat Suchard and moved production to nearby Serrières, where he produced 25–30 kg of chocolate daily in a rented former water mill. During the 1890s, milk was added to Suchard's chocolate, closely following the launch of the Gala Peter brand, founded by Daniel Peter, another Swiss chocolatier.

Carl Russ-Suchard, Philippe Suchard's son-in-law, invented the Milka brand in 1901. The first "Milka" chocolate was packaged in the distinctive lilac-colored packaging. Their products were introduced in Austria in the 1910s in order to spread popularity, and by 1913 the company was producing 18 times more chocolate than they did when at the original plant in 1880. By the 1920s Milka had introduced limited edition themed chocolates. Themes were related around holidays such as Christmas and Easter and had chocolate cast into the shape of Santa Claus, Christmas ornaments, Easter bunnies and various sizes of Easter eggs. By the 1960s the Milka script logo and its lilac packaging was trademarked, quickly becoming Germany’s number one chocolate. Over the next few decades, Milka chocolate enlarged in bigger portions and improved their selection of chocolate products. 

In 1970, Suchard merged with Tobler to become Interfood. Interfood merged with the Jacobs coffee company in 1982, becoming Jacobs Suchard. Kraft Foods acquired Jacobs Suchard, including Milka, in 1990. In 1995 Milka officially became a ski sponsor and would later become one of the most famous sport sponsors after the FIS Alpine Cup that was held in Lienz. In October 2012, Kraft spun off its snack food division, which was renamed Mondelēz International. In 2016, they further expanded their market into China.

Advertising

The brand's symbol is a lilac Simmental cow with a bell around her neck, usually in an Alpine meadow. During the 1990s, Peter Steiner appeared in Milka commercials.

Milka has put focus on “tenderness” being their main advertising theme since the 1960s. In 1972, the Milka cow named Lila ("Lila" being German for lilac, purple, violet.) became the face of their advertising campaigns and has remained so to the current day. Milka has sponsored many alpine skiing stars since 1995, including five World and Olympic champions. In 2015, Milka used a lilac-colored boat with Lila the mascot on it to tour the rivers of Germany and Austria during the summer. This boat was dubbed the “Muhboot” (pronounced Moo-boat), a pun on "U-Boot" (German for submarine).

Products
Milka is sold in a number of packages and flavors, according to where it is purchased:

Chocolate bars

Alpine Milk – Milk-chocolate bar
 Broken Nuts – Milk-chocolate bar with hazelnut pieces
 Milka and Daim – Milk-chocolate bar with Daim bar pieces
 Milka and Oreo – Milk-chocolate bar with Oreo filling
 Choco-Swing – Milk-chocolate bar with a biscuit filling
 Choco and Biscuit – Milk-chocolate with cocoa creme filling and a layer of biscuit
 Strawberry Yogurt – Milk-chocolate bar with strawberry filling
 Caramel – Milk-chocolate bar with caramel filling
 Almond Caramel – Milk-chocolate bar with pieces of almonds and caramel filling
 Whole Hazelnuts – Milk-chocolate bar with whole hazelnuts
 White Chocolate – White chocolate bar
 White Coconut – White-chocolate bar with coconut
 Raisins and Hazelnuts – Milk-chocolate bar with raisins and pieces of hazelnut
 Raspberry Cream – Milk-chocolate bar with raspberry fillings
 Cow Spots or Happy Cow – Milk-chocolate bar with white-chocolate spots

Toffees
 Milka Toffee – Milk-chocolate-covered toffee filled with caramel
 Milka Toffee Hazelnut

Other products
 Philadelphia Milka Cheese
 Hazelnut cocoa spread

German varieties

 Alpine Milk 
 Grapes and Nuts
 Strawberry
 Milka and LU Cookies
 Peanut Crisp
 White Chocolate and Oreo 
 Milka an Oreo-Sandwich
 Triple Choco Cocoa
 Colourful Chocolate Lentils
 Milka and TUC-Cracker
 Milka and Daim
 Noisette
 Whole Hazelnuts
 Cow Spots
 Yogurt
 Broken Hazelnuts
 White Chocolate
 Caramel
 Dark Chocolate
 Luflée
 Alpine Milk Creme
 Large Bar 
 Whole Hazelnuts 
 Strawberry Cheesecake 
 Almond Caramel 
 Peanut Caramel 
 Milka and Oreo 
 Chocolate Cookie 
 Toffee Whole Hazelnut 
 Alpine Milk 
 Noisette 
 Triple Choc 
 Luflée Caramel 
 Nut Nougat Creme 
 Crispy Yogurt 
 Dark Edition
 Broken Hazelnut
 Cocoa Splinter 
 Dark Alpine Milk
 Salted Caramel 
 Almond 
 Raspberry

References

Further reading

External links

 

Brand name chocolate
Chocolate bars
Mondelez International brands
Swiss chocolate
Swiss brands
Canton of Neuchâtel
Products introduced in 1900
1990 mergers and acquisitions